Elin Ek may refer to:

Elin Ek (actress) {born 1976)
Elin Ek (cross-country skier) (born 1973)